Burg Wildenstein (Leibertingen), a fortified spur castle, built between 1200 and 1300 A.D., is situated above the Danube break-through at the Swabian Alb in Baden-Württemberg, Germany. It functions now as a hostel of the German Youth Hostel Association ("Deutsches Jugendherbergswerk").

See also 
 List of forts
 List of castles in Baden-Württemberg

Further reading 
 The Zimmern Chronicle
 Gunter Haug und Heinrich Güntner: Burg Wildenstein über dem Tal der jungen Donau. DRW-Verlag. Leinfelden-Echterdingen 2001. 
 Otto Piper: Burgenkunde, Bauwesen und Geschichte der Burgen. München 1912. Nachdruck, Weltbild Verlag, Augsburg, 1993. 
 Günter Schmitt: Wildenstein und Leibertinger Ortsburg. In: Derselbe: Burgenführer Schwäbische Alb. Band 3: Donautal. Wandern und entdecken zwischen Sigmaringen und Tuttlingen. S. 181–200. Biberacher Verlagsdruckerei. Biberach 1990.

External links 

 The Sigenot wall painting in the main building of the Burg Wildenstein (photos, plans, literature and historical background information).
 Youth hostel Burg Wildenstein
 Photos, showing some aerial images.

Landmarks in Germany